Prabhagaran S, commonly known as Prabha, is a member of India's men's national volleyball team. He wears jersey #13. He currently plays for Kochi Blue Spikers in Pro Volleyball League.

References

Living people
1988 births
Volleyball players from Puducherry